The Colorado Pacific Rio Grande Railroad (formerly the San Luis & Rio Grande Railroad) is a class III railroad operating in south-central Colorado. It runs on 154 miles of former Denver and Rio Grande Western Railroad tracks on three lines radiating from Alamosa and interchanges with the Union Pacific Railroad in Walsenburg. Much of the railroad is located in the San Luis Valley. In 2022, it was purchased by Stefan Soloviev.

History
The oldest predecessor of the railroad was the Denver and Rio Grande Railroad, which was chartered in 1870. The line over La Veta Pass to Alamosa and Antonito was originally envisioned as part of an ambitious and never-realized narrow gauge line linking Denver with Mexico City. The narrow gauge tracks crossed the pass in 1877 and reached Alamosa on July 6, 1878. The railroad was pushed on to Antonito by 1880 and ultimately to Santa Fe and Silverton. The D&RG built west from Alamosa, completing the line to South Fork and its terminus at Creede in 1881.

By the late 1880s, the inherent isolation of narrow gauge railroads from the national network began to put them at a competitive disadvantage. The D&RG converted the La Veta Pass and the Creede lines to standard gauge around 1900. The line to Antonito was also converted to standard gauge, but a third rail, laid to three-foot gauge, remained to Alamosa until the end of regular narrow gauge operation in 1968. Coincident with the conversion to standard gauge, the D&RG realigned the route over La Veta Pass to lower the summit, straighten curves, and reduce grades.

In 1908, the D&RG was consolidated with the Rio Grande Western to form the Denver and Rio Grande Western. In 1988, the DRGW merged with the Southern Pacific Railroad; the Union Pacific Railroad purchased and merged the SP in 1996. In June 2003, the UP sold the Walsenburg - Alamosa line and its other lines in the San Luis Valley to shortline railroad conglomerate RailAmerica. The Derrick - Creede line, which had been out of service, was sold to the Denver and Rio Grande Historical Foundation as a tourist line. RailAmerica sold the SLRG to Iowa Pacific Holdings in December 2005.

Iowa Pacific Bankruptcy

Iowa Pacific Holdings and its subsidiaries had severe financial trouble and held large debts. In 2019 and 2020, many of IPH's subsidiaries were placed into receivership. The San Luis & Rio Grande Railroad was forced into Chapter 11 bankruptcy and was appointed a trustee by a U.S. bankruptcy court in Denver. Between 2020 and 2021, the trustee maintained freight operations and spent $1.3 million rehabilitating parts of the line and another $250,000 cleaning up the railyard in Alamosa. Throughout the bankruptcy proceedings, the railroad was operated by the trustee, with various rolling stock for sale.

Soloviev Group ownership
On September 12, 2022, Denver-based railroad holding company OmniTRAX announced it would purchase the SLRG at a cost of $5.7 million. This raised concern among some local citizens who cited OmniTRAX's recent history of abandoning lines it couldn't make profitable, and from trails advocates who worried OmniTRAX would not let them expand trail networks among the railroad's right-of-way.

Two new bids for the railroad followed in November 2022, one from one of the SLRG's largest creditor and the other from Stefan Soloviev. On November 17, 2022 Soloviev's final bid of $10.7 million was selected by the bankruptcy trust. The bankruptcy judge approved the sale, which will become effective upon Surface Transportation Board approval.

Operations

Trackage
The railroad operates on 154 miles of track.

 Alamosa east to Walsenburg (over La Veta Pass), where it connects with the Union Pacific Railroad.
 Alamosa south to Antonito, where it meets the narrow gauge Cumbres and Toltec Scenic Railroad.
 Alamosa west to South Fork. It meets the San Luis Central Railroad on this line in Monte Vista.

Heritage railroad

A subsidiary heritage railroad, the Rio Grande Scenic Railroad, operated passenger excursion trains between Alamosa and La Veta during the summer months from 2006 to 2019. They also offered trips from Alamosa to Antonito, where passengers could connect with the narrow gauge Cumbres and Toltec.

These lines were freight only for decades under the previous railroad owners, making it popular with railroad enthusiasts who log rare mileage. The route over Veta Pass offered historic views inaccessible by road, and outdoor events were held at the Fir Concert Grounds near highest point on the railroad.

Between 2007 and 2013, the fan trips would often be pulled by a steam locomotive. First, there was Ex-Southern Pacific 2-6-0 “Mogul” type No. 1744, but it was taken out of service quickly due to firebox issues. The only other steam locomotive that operated on the SLRG was Ex-Lake Superior and Ishpeming 2-8-0 “consolidation” type No. 18.

SLRG discontinued the passenger excursions in 2019 following a wildfire that damaged the Fir Concert Grounds, and then later when the railroad entered bankruptcy and began liquidating unnecessary assets. This liquidation involved the sale of locomotives and rolling stock to the Colebrookdale Railroad and the Reading Blue Mountain and Northern Railroad in Pennsylvania.

Gallery

References

External links

San Luis & Rio Grande Railroad
Rio Grande Scenic Railroad
Rio Grande Scenic Railroad Photos

Colorado railroads
RailAmerica
Spin-offs of the Union Pacific Railroad